The 1970–71 Divizia A was the fifty-third season of Divizia A, the top-level football league of Romania.

Teams

League table

Results

Top goalscorers

Champion squad

See also 

 1970–71 Divizia B
 1970–71 Divizia C
 1970–71 County Championship

References

Liga I seasons
Romania
1970–71 in Romanian football